Shaker Mountain, is a prominent peak in the Taconic Mountains of western Massachusetts. The mountain is located in Pittsfield State Forest and is named after the nearby Hancock Shaker Village, a former Shaker religious colony and now a historic site. The summit is wooded and is traversed by the  Shaker Trail, a loop trail that begins at the historic site. The mountain is wooded with northern hardwood tree species.

Shaker Mountain is located within Hancock, Massachusetts. The Taconic ridgeline continues north from Shaker Mountain as Doll Mountain and west as Holy Mount The mountain drains into Shaker Brook and Lily Brook, thence to the Housatonic River and Long Island Sound.

References

 Massachusetts Trail Guide (2004). Boston: Appalachian Mountain Club.
 Commonwealth Connections proposal PDF download. Retrieved March 2, 2008.
 AMC Massachusetts and Rhode Island Trail Guide (1989). Boston: Appalachian Mountain Club.
 "Greenways and Trails" Massachusetts DCR. Retrieved February 22, 2008.

External links
 Pittsfield State Forest map
 Pittsfield State Forest. Massachusetts DCR.

Mountains of Berkshire County, Massachusetts
Taconic Mountains